Zoran Vraneš (born September 14, 1950) is a Serbian former football player and coach currently working as an assistant coach for Trinidad & Tobago and head coach for North East Stars.

Playing career
Born in Pljevlja, SR Montenegro, then one of the republics constituting Yugoslavia, Zoran Vranes first made his name as a player of Partizan and Šumadija.

Coaching career
He coached Rudar Pljevlja. He then choached the Trinidad and Tobago national football team. He has received praise for helping to transform the defencemen of St Vincent and the Grenadines football into a formidable defensive team. He took six points in six games of FIFA World Cup qualifying but it proved insufficient. Then came a middling finish in the Caribbean Nations Cup, followed by the history-setting year of 2006, when they beat the Jamaica national football team in a 2-1 win. It was the first time that St Vincent ever beat Jamaica in football, and they won it with defence. However, the team was ultimately unable to win the championship, making it only to the 8-team finals.

Coaching career
Trinidad and Tobago - 1996 CONCACAF Gold Cup

References

External links
 

1950 births
Living people
Sportspeople from Pljevlja
Association football defenders
Yugoslav footballers
FK Crvenka players
FK Partizan players
FK Šumadija Aranđelovac players
Yugoslav First League players
Serbia and Montenegro football managers
FK Rudar Pljevlja managers
Trinidad and Tobago national football team managers
Antigua and Barbuda national football team managers
Joe Public F.C. managers
Saint Vincent and the Grenadines national football team managers
Serbian football managers
Central F.C. managers
North East Stars F.C. managers
TT Pro League managers
Serbia and Montenegro expatriate football managers
Expatriate football managers in Trinidad and Tobago
Expatriate football managers in Antigua and Barbuda
Expatriate football managers in Saint Vincent and the Grenadines
Serbian expatriate football managers
Serbia and Montenegro expatriate sportspeople in Antigua and Barbuda
Serbia and Montenegro expatriate sportspeople in Saint Vincent and the Grenadines
Serbia and Montenegro expatriate sportspeople in Trinidad and Tobago